Take Off! with The Savvy Stews (also branded as Take Off!) is an American travel-themed television series.

The show is hosted by "The Savvy Stews," Bobby Laurie and Gailen David. With a combined 40 years in the travel industry as flight attendants and travel writers, they share their experiences for novice travelers as well as experienced jet-setters.

Show concept
This show is based on David and Laurie's appearances on local morning talk shows and their on-location travel segments. Since 2010 both flight attendants have been appearing on television offering viewers tips, tricks and insider information based on their industry experience.

In September 2010, Bobby Laurie first appeared on Daytime with travel tips and suggestions on how to pack easier. Since then, he and David have been appearing on the show for nearly four years.

In January 2013, as "The Savvy Stews," the duo signed on with Better (TV series) Show to provide them with on-location travel segments airing every other Wednesday. The segments were branded "Trippin with Better." However, in June 2013 the Stews decided to leave the show.

The next step was The Daily Buzz, a nationally syndicated morning news program. Their first segment aired on September 10, 2013 from Mazatlan, Mexico and later won them a Telly Award in the Travel Programs & Segments: Travel/Tourism category. Though their agreement didn't expire until August 2014, in April 2014 Laurie & David renewed their position with the show through August 2015.

Distribution
Take Off! has been broadcast on Destination America, a channel featuring lifestyle, historical and travel programs. It is the network's first travel show. The show is also available on Hulu.

References

External links
 

2010s American television news shows
English-language television shows
Destination America original programming